Praise were an English new-age music group formed in London in 1991, comprising Geoff MacCormack, Simon Goldenberg and Miriam Stockley. The group was considered to be foundational in the genre of ethnic electronica.

Praise released one self titled album in 1991, which was produced, engineered and mixed by Richard James Burgess. Praise combined European dance beats with a variety of traditional world samples and styles along with Miriam Stockley's vocals, in a manner that was continued by artists such as Enigma, Deep Forest and Adiemus (which also featured Stockley's vocals).

The tracks segue using soundscape elements, and the album was one of the few ever to be mixed using Qsound which provided virtual surround sound out of a pair of stereo speakers. MacCormack and Goldenberg arranged and performed many of the instrumental parts, the latter providing the necessary computer programming. Stockley arranged and performed the lead and many backing vocals.

All three have writing credits for Praise, and were supplemented by other specialised world performers. "Only You", the second track from Praise, was used for an advert for the Fiat Tempra. It was subsequently remixed by producers Andreas Georgiou (cousin of George Michael) and Peter Lorrimer, and went on to become a hit single, peaking at number four on the UK Singles Chart.

Stockley's vocals for this track were sampled extensively in the dance track of 2000, "Fiji" by Atlantis, which peaked at number 52 in the United Kingdom. In the same year, they released the single "Dream On". Praise disbanded some time after Praise was released; Stockley went on to perform lead vocals on Karl Jenkins's Adiemus albums.

References

Musical groups from London
New-age music groups